No. 1457 (Fighter) Flight was formed at RAF Colerne on 15 September 1941, and was equipped with Turbinlite Douglas Boston and Douglas Havoc aircraft. On operations they cooperated with the Hawker Hurricanes of 247 Squadron. By 15 November 1941 the flight moved to RAF Predannack, Cornwall. During its operational life the flight had three sightings of possible enemy aircraft. The first occasion was on 24 June 1942, when the flight lit up a suspected Ju 88 and the satellite fighters of 247 sqn fired - on a RAF Short Stirling. Others sightings occurred on 27 June and in August, but no enemy aircraft was shot down. The flight was replaced with 536 Squadron on 8 September 1942 (not on 2 September due to administrative reasons) but officially disbanded as late as 31 December 1942.

536 Sqn, which had taken over men and machines, carried on flying the Turbinlite Bostons and Havocs till the system was abandoned on 25 January 1943, when Turbinlite squadrons were, due to lack of success on their part and the rapid development of AI radar, thought to be superfluous.

Aircraft operated

Flight bases

Commanding officers

References 
Notes

Bibliography

 Delve, Ken. The Source Book of the RAF. Shrewsbury, Shropshire, UK: Airlife Publishing, 1994. .
 Halley, James J. The Squadrons of the Royal Air Force & Commonwealth 1918-1988. Tonbridge, Kent, UK: Air Britain (Historians) Ltd., 1988. .
 Jefford, C.G. RAF Squadrons, a Comprehensive record of the Movement and Equipment of all RAF Squadrons and their Antecedents since 1912. Shrewsbury, Shropshire, UK: Airlife Publishing, 1988 (second edition 2001). .
 Lake, Alan. Flying Units of the RAF. Shrewsbury, Shropshire, UK: Airlife Publishing, 1999. .
 Rawlings, John D.R. Fighter Squadrons of the RAF and their Aircraft. London: Macdonald & Jane's (Publishers) Ltd., 1969 (2nd edition 1976, reprinted 1978). .
 Sturtivant, Ray, ISO and John Hamlin. RAF Flying Training And Support Units since 1912. Tonbridge, Kent, UK: Air-Britain (Historians) Ltd., 2007. .

External links
 Aircraft and Markings of no. 511-598 sqn, amongst them 536 sqn, the successor of 1457 flt.

1457 Flight
Military units and formations established in 1941